is a video game composer who worked for Konami. During the late 1980's to the early 1990's he was a member of the Konami Kukeiha Club, and worked as composer and sound designer on various arcade and console games. He was later transfered to Konami's Bemani division where he contributed several tracks that have been featured in the GuitarFreaks series of video games as well as Dance Dance Revolution Supernova. He left the company in 2013 to form his own music brand called Elephant15+.

Soundtracks
Gradius III (Arcade) - 1989
Surprise Attack (Arcade) - 1990
Teenage Mutant Ninja Turtles II: The Arcade Game (NES) - 1990
The Lone Ranger (NES) - 1991
Teenage Mutant Ninja Turtles III: The Manhattan Project (NES) - 1991
Monster in My Pocket (NES) - 1992
Zen: Intergalactic Ninja (NES) - 1993
Rakugakids (N64) - 1998

External links

Japanese composers
Japanese male composers
Living people
Video game composers
Place of birth missing (living people)
Year of birth missing (living people)